300 AD was a year.

300 may also refer to:
 300 BC
 300 (number)

Cartridges
 .300 AAC Blackout
 .300 Winchester Magnum
 .300 Whisper
 .300 Savage
 .300 Remington Ultra Magnum
 .300 Winchester Short Magnum
 .300 Weatherby Magnum
 .300 H&H Magnum
 .300 Sherwood
 .300 Ruger Compact Magnum
 .300 Remington Short Action Ultra Magnum

Electronics
 Ideacentre Stick 300, a pocket-sized PC in the Lenovo Ideacentre line
 IdeaPad 300, a notebook computer in the Lenovo IdeaPad line
 IdeaPad Miix 300, a tablet computer in the Lenovo Miix line

Entertainment
 300 (comics), a comics mini-series by Frank Miller, based on the Battle of Thermopylae
 300 (film), a 2007 epic war film based on the comic
 300 (soundtrack), the soundtrack of the film
 300: Rise of an Empire, a 2014 film sequel to the 2007 film
 300: March to Glory, a video game based on the comic
 "300" (1975), a pinball game with a bowling theme
 300 Entertainment, a record label
 300 (television), a Catalan public television channel
 "300", an episode of American Dad!

People
 300 Spartans or The Three Hundred, the Spartans who fought to the death at the Battle of Thermopylae
 Old 300, a group of settlers in the Republic of Texas
 300 soldiers of Gideon, an ancient Judge of Israel
 300 dissidents of La Guaira naval attack attempting to take over 25,000 Venezuelan military personnel

Sports

Motor racing
 Alsco 300 (Kentucky), a NASCAR series
 California 300, a NASCAR stock car race
 CampingWorld.com 300, a former NASCAR race
 Chicagoland 300, a NASCAR stock car race
 Ford EcoBoost 300, a NASCAR race
 Indy 300, a former open-wheel motor race event
 Hisense 4K TV 300, a NASCAR race event
 Nashville 300, a former NASCAR Nationwide series
 Northern 300, a NASCAR stock car race event
 PowerShares QQQ 300, a first race from NASCAR
 VisitMyrtleBeach.com 300, a former NASCAE race in Sparta, Kentucky

Other sports
 300-win club, a group of pitchers

Transportation

Roads
 Delaware Route 300, a state highway
 Maryland Route 300, a state highway
 Tennessee State Route 300, a four-lane controlled-access expressway

Vehicles
 Airbus A300, a commercial jet airliner
 Chrysler 300, a luxury and full-sized vehicle made and sold by Chrysler
 Dragoon 300
 Jagdgeschwader 300
 Kawasaki Ninja 300, a sport bike
 Latécoère 300
 Lexus ES 300, a mid-size luxury sedan sold by Lexus
 Lexus IS 300, a compact executive car sold by Lexus
 Lexus RX 300, a luxury crossover sold by Lexus
 Nissan 300C
 Nissan 300ZX
 Schweizer 300, a helicopter
 300 Series Shinkansen

Other
 Committee of 300, aka The Olympians, a conspiracy theory
 NGC 300, a galaxy

See also
 300 series (disambiguation)